Salford is a city in Greater Manchester, England. The city is situated in a meander on the western bank of the River Irwell which forms its boundary with Manchester and its city centre. Landmarks in the city include the 100 Greengate skyscraper, the old town hall, cathedral and St Philips Church. It is the main settlement of the wider City of Salford metropolitan borough.

Nearby towns in the built-up area include Stretford, Bolton, Sale and Bury with additional towns nearby being Prestwich, Radcliffe and Urmston. The wider metropolitan borough  includes the towns of Eccles, Pendlebury, Swinton, Walkden and other surrounding villages and suburbs. 

It was the former Salfordshire's judicial seat in historic county of Lancashire. It was granted a market charter in about 1230 by Ranulf de Blondeville, 6th Earl of Chester. These two initially made it of greater cultural and commercial importance than neighbouring Manchester: the Industrial Revolution of the late 18th and early 19th centuries reversed that relationship. The former County Borough of Salford was granted city status in 1926: the current wider borough was established in 1974.

Economy of the city was focused on a major cotton and silk spinning and weaving factory district in the 18th and 19th centuries and important inland port on the Manchester Ship Canal from 1894. Industrial decline in the 20th century lead to the city having run-down and antisocial areas. Multiple media sector headquarters relocated to the Salford Quays development called MediaCityUK to replace the loss of heavy industrial. Notable establishments and companies in the city include the University of Salford, Salford City Football Club, Salford Lads' Club, BBC North and ITV Granada.

History

Toponymy
The name of Salford derives from the Old English word Sealhford, meaning a ford by the willow trees. It referred to the willows or sallows that grew alongside the banks of the River Irwell. The ford was about where Victoria Bridge is today. Willow trees are still found in Lower Broughton. Salford appears in the pipe roll of 1169 as "Sauford" and in the Lancashire Inquisitions of 1226 as "Sainford".

Early history

The earliest known evidence of human activity in what is now Salford is provided by the Neolithic flint arrow-heads and workings discovered on Kersal Moor and the River Irwell, suggesting that the area was inhabited 7–10,000 years ago. The raw material for such tools was scarce and unsuitable for working, and as a result they are not of the quality found elsewhere. Other finds include a neolithic axe-hammer found near Mode Wheel, during the excavation of the Manchester Ship Canal in 1890, and a Bronze Age cremation urn during the construction of a road on the Broughton Hall estate in 1873.

The Brigantes were the major Celtic tribe in what is now Northern England. With a stronghold at the sandstone outcrop on which Manchester Cathedral now stands, opposite Salford's original centre, their territory extended across the fertile lowland by the River Irwell that is now Salford and Stretford. Following the Roman conquest of Britain, General Agricola ordered the construction of a Roman fort named Mamucium (Manchester) to protect the routes to Deva Victrix (Chester) and Eboracum (York) from the Brigantes. Salford was founded when the fort was completed in AD 79, and for over 300 years the Pax Romana brought peace to the area. Both the main Roman road to the north, from Mamucium to Ribchester, and a second road to the west, ran through what is now Salford, but few Roman artefacts have been found in the area. The withdrawal of the Romans in AD 410 left the inhabitants at the mercy of the Saxons. The Danes later conquered the area and absorbed what was left of the Brigantes. Angles settled in the region during the Early Middle Ages and gave the locality the name Sealhford, meaning "ford by the willows". According to the Anglo-Saxon Chronicle, Sealhford was part of the Kingdom of Northumbria until it was conquered in 923 by Edward the Elder.

Following the emergence of the united Kingdom of England, Salford became a caput or central manor within a broad rural area in part held by the Kings of England, including Edward the Confessor. The area between the rivers Mersey and Ribble was divided into six smaller districts, referred to as "wapentakes", or hundreds. The south east district became known as the Hundred of Salford, a division of land administered from Salford for military and judicial purposes. It contained nine large parishes, smaller parts of two others, and the township of Aspull in the parish of Wigan.

Poitevin created the subordinate Manor of Manchester out of the hundred, which has since in local government been separate from Salford. Poitevin forfeited the manor in 1102 when he was defeated in a failed rebellion attempt against Henry I. In around 1115, for their support during the rebellion, Henry I placed the Hundred of Salford under the control of the Earldom of Lancaster, and it is from this exchange that the Hundred of Salford became a royal manor. The Lord of the Manor was either the English monarch, or a feudal land owner who administered the manor for the king. During the reign of Henry II the Royal Manor of Salford passed to Ranulf de Gernon, 4th Earl of Chester.

Salford began to emerge as a small town early in the 13th century. In 1228, Henry III granted the caput of Salford the right to hold a market and an annual fair. The fairs were important to the town; a 17th-century order forced each burgess – a freeman of the borough  – to attend, but the fairs were abolished during the 19th century. The Earls of Chester aided the development of the caput, and in 1230 Ranulf de Blondeville, 6th Earl of Chester made Salford a burgage, or free borough. The charter gave its burgesses certain commercial rights, privileges and advantages over traders living outside Salford; one of the 26 clauses of the charter stated that no one could work in the Hundred of Salford unless they also lived in the borough. Salford's status as a burgage encouraged an influx of distinguished families, and by the Late Middle Ages Salford was "rich in its manor houses", with over 30 within a  radius of Ordsall. These included Ordsall Hall (owned by the Radclyffe family) and Broughton Hall, owned by the Earls of Derby.

During the Civil War of 1640–49, Salford supported the Royalist cause, in contrast to Manchester just across the Irwell which declared in favour of the Parliamentarians. Royalist forces mounted a siege of Manchester across what is now the site of Victoria Bridge, which although short-lived, "did little to improve relations between the two towns". A century later, in 1745, Salford was staunchly in support of Bonnie Prince Charlie, in his attempt to seize the Throne of England. He entered the town at the head of his army and was blessed by the Reverend John Clayton before leaving "in high spirits" to march on London; he returned to Salford in defeat just nine days later.

Industrial Revolution

Salford has a history of textile processing that pre-dates the Industrial Revolution, and as an old town had been developing for about 700 years. Before the introduction of cotton there was a considerable trade in woollen goods and fustians. Other cottage industries prevalent at this time included clogging, cobbling, weaving and brewing. The changes to textile manufacture during the Industrial Revolution had a profound effect on both on population and urbanisation, as well as the socioeconomic and cultural conditions of Salford.

The well-established textile processing and trading infrastructure, and the ready supply of water from the River Irwell and its tributaries, attracted entrepreneurs who built cotton mills along the banks of the river in Pendleton and Ordsall. Although Salford followed a similar pattern of industrial development to Manchester, most businesses preferred to build their premises on the Manchester side of the Irwell, and consequently Salford did not develop as a commercial centre in the same way as its neighbour. Many of these earlier mills had been based on Arkwright-type designs. These relied on strong falls of water, but Salford is on a meander of the Irwell with only a slight gradient and thus mills tended to be built upstream, at Kersal and Pendleton. However, with the introduction of the steam engine in the late 18th century, merchants began to construct mills closer to the centres of Salford and Manchester, where supplies of labour and coal were more readily available (the first steam-powered mill was built in Manchester in 1780). One of the first factories to be built was Philip's and Lee's Twist Mill in Salford, completed in 1801, the second iron-framed multi-story building to be erected in Britain. The large Salford Engine Twist Company mill was built to the west of Salford, between Chapel Street and the Irwell, and in 1806 was the first large cotton mill to use gas lighting. Many engineering companies were established in this area, including Samuel Ellis and Company at the Irwell Foundry. However, it was outnumbered by the numerous smaller factories and mills throughout the area, including Nathan Gough's steam-driven mule spinning mill, near Oldfield Road, where a serious accident occurred on 13 October 1824 (see illustration).

Canal building provided a further stimulus for Salford's industrial development. The opening of the Bridgewater Canal in 1761 improved the transport of fuel and raw materials, reducing the price of coal by about 50%. The later Manchester, Bolton & Bury Canal (which terminated at Salford) brought more cheap coal from pits at Pendleton, Agecroft Colliery and beyond. By 1818 Manchester, Salford and Eccles had about 80 mills, but it was the completion of the Manchester Ship Canal in 1894 which triggered Salford's development as a major inland port. By 1914 the Port of Manchester, most of whose docks were in Salford, had become one of the largest port authorities in the world, handling 5% of the UK's imports and 4.4% of its exports. Commodities handled included cotton, grain, wool, textile machinery and steam locomotives.

For centuries, textiles and related trades were the main source of employment in the town. Bleaching was a widely distributed finishing trade in Salford, carried over from the earlier woollen industry. In the 18th century, before the introduction of chemical bleaching, bleaching fields were commonplace, some very close to the town. In 1773 there were 25 bleachers around Salford, most to the west of the township. Printing was another source of trade; the earliest recorded in the region was a calique printer in the Manchester Parish Register of 1763. These industries became more important as Salford faced increasing competition from the nearby towns of Bolton and Oldham. As its cotton spinning industries faltered its economy turned increasingly to other textiles and to the finishing trades, including rexine and silk dyeing, and fulling and bleaching, at a string of works in Salford.

Both Karl Marx and Friedrich Engels spent time in Salford, studying the plight of the British working class. In The Condition of the Working Class in England in 1844, Engels described Salford as "really one large working-class quarter ... [a] very unhealthy, dirty and dilapidated district which, while other industries were almost always textile related is situated opposite the 'Old Church' of Manchester".

The effect on Salford of the Industrial Revolution has been described as "phenomenal". The area expanded from a small market town into a major industrial metropolis; factories replaced cottage industries, and the population rose from 12,000 in 1812 to 70,244 within 30 years. By the end of the 19th century it had increased to 220,000. Large-scale building of low quality Victorian terraced housing did not stop overcrowding, which itself led to chronic social deprivation. The density of housing was as high as 80 homes per acre. Private roads were built for the use of the middle classes moving to the outskirts of Salford. The entrances to such roads, which included Elleray Road in Irlams o' th' Height, were often gated, and patrolled.

Post-industrial decline

During the early 20th century, improvements in regional transport infrastructure precipitated the decline of Salford's existing industries, including those at the Salford Docks. Increased foreign competition began to undermine the competitiveness of local textile processing businesses. Rising unemployment during the Great Depression of the 1920s and 1930s, and a significant economic decline in the decades following the Second World War contributed toward a fall in Salford's population. By 1939 local coal mining had almost stopped, and cotton spinning had by 1971 ceased completely. Between 1921 and 1939, the population of Salford decreased by 29%, from 234,045 to 166,386, far greater than the rate of decline within the whole of North West England.

A survey in 1931 concluded that parts of Salford contained some of the worst slums in the country. Many houses were infested by rats and lacked elementary amenities. Inspectors found that of 950 houses surveyed, 257 were in a state of bad repair with leaking roofs, broken flooring and rotten woodwork. The inspectors were "struck by the courage and perseverance with which the greater number of tenants kept their houses clean and respectable under most adverse conditions". By 1933, slum clearance projects were under way, and by the end of 1956 over a thousand families had been rehoused in overspill estates at Little Hulton. These clearances have, for some, changed the character of the area to such an extent that "observers in search of the typical Salford may have to look in Eccles and Swinton, for much of the community and townscape ... has gone from Salford, replaced by tall blocks of flats". Large areas of the city were redeveloped in the 1960s and 1970s, with Victorian era terraced housing estates that inspired painter L. S. Lowry and soap opera Coronation Street giving way to concrete tower blocks and austere architecture. Life in Salford during the early 20th century was described by Robert Roberts, in his study The Classic Slum.

Despite extensive redevelopment, throughout the 1980s and 1990s the area experienced high levels of deprivation and unemployment, particularly during the recessions of the early years of both decades. This social deprivation was a major factor in the increased levels of gang crime linked to illegal narcotics, firearms and robberies. This was comparable to the similar issues faced in parts of neighbouring Manchester including Moss Side, as well as areas of the more distant neighbouring city of Liverpool.

Organised crime in Salford, particularly in Ordsall and Pendleton, "began to have a disturbing effect on grass roots democracy. Both the Liberal Democrats and the Conservatives announced they would not contest certain Salford wards" because they regarded them as "unsafe" and would put their "party workers at risk". Salford's social amenities and the night-time economy folded amid criminal "intimidation", "drug use, fights and demands for money". In early 2005, the Government of Latvia appealed to the European Union to advise people against travelling to Salford after a Latvian man was stabbed in the head in Lower Broughton. However, a crackdown by Greater Manchester Police coupled with investment in, and structural changes to the housing stock, began changing Salford's fortunes; population decline has slowed, and Salford's city councillors have insisted it is a safe place to visit. In August 2005, a survey by Channel 4 television rated the city as the 9th worst place to live in the United Kingdom, based on criteria of crime, education, environment, lifestyle and employment.

Regeneration

Salford has suffered from high levels of unemployment, housing, and social problems since around the 1960s, although there are regeneration schemes to reverse its fortunes. Many of the high-rise housing blocks from the 1960s and 1970s were demolished during the 1990s, "a sign that the great social engineering schemes (from that period) had failed". However, the high-rises that remain are a striking feature of Salford's landscape. Work was scheduled to begin on the £180 million redevelopment of the Greengate area of Salford in January 2007. The plans include the construction of what will be the two tallest tower blocks in Salford. Plans also include a five-star hotel, a new public square and park, restaurants, cafes and 403 apartments. Work is ongoing to regenerate the area known as Middlewood Locks, with the restored Salford terminus of the Manchester Bolton & Bury Canal forming the centrepiece of a brand new residential development. As part of the Pathfinder initiative, Salford was identified in 2002 as one of nine areas in specific need of investment for new homes. Between 2003 and 2006 £115M was invested in the Manchester and City of Salford housing markets, £44M of which was invested in central Salford. Rows of terraces in neighbourhoods such as Seedley and Langworthy – once used for the title sequence of Coronation Street – are being compulsorily purchased, demolished and replaced by "modern sustainable accommodation". Other schemes such as the Charlestown and Lower Kersal New deal for Communities, have concentrated on renovating existing terraced housing stock by block improvement and alleygating, as well as demolishing unsuitable properties and building new facilities, in consultation with the local community.

Salford now has many tourist attractions, such as Ordsall Hall, the Bridgewater Canal and the Lowry Centre, an award-winning theatre and art gallery complex, consisting of two theatres and three art galleries. The centre is named after the artist L. S. Lowry, who attended Salford School of Art and lived in nearby Pendlebury for 40 years. Many of his paintings of Salford and Manchester mill scenes, populated with small matchstick-like figures, are on display.

A notable regeneration project is MediaCityUK, located at Salford Quays. The development houses BBC departments including CBBC, BBC Sport and Radio 5 Live which moved in 2011 and BBC Breakfast, which moved from London in spring 2012.

In recent years, various large residential schemes have been built in Salford. A notable development, the £700m Middlewood Locks began construction in 2016.

Governance
Salford was anciently part of the Manchester parish of the Salford Hundred, an area much larger than the present-day city of Salford, within the historic county boundaries of Lancashire. A stroke of a Norman baron's pen is said to have divorced Manchester and Salford, although it was not Salford that became separated from Manchester, but Manchester, with its humbler line of lords, that was separated from Salford. Salford received its town charter from Ranulf de Blondeville, 6th Earl of Chester, then Lord of the Manor, in 1230. From then until 1791, when police commissioners were appointed, it was governed by a reeve, a medieval administrator and law enforcement official. It was not recognised as a borough in the Municipal Corporations Act 1835, but was granted borough status in 1844; the new Salford borough was made up of the township of Salford and part of Broughton. The remainder of Broughton, the township of Pendleton, and a small part of Pendlebury were added in 1853.

When the administrative county of Lancashire was created by the Local Government Act 1888, Salford was elevated to become the County Borough of Salford and was, in modern terms, a unitary authority area exempt from the administration of Lancashire County Council. Following a campaign supported by William Joynson-Hicks, Home Secretary and Member of Parliament (MP) for a neighbouring constituency of Manchester, city status was granted to the county borough by letters patent dated 21 April 1926. This was in spite of the opposition of civil servants in the Home Office who dismissed the borough as "merely a scratch collection of 240,000 people cut off from Manchester by the river". In 1961, a small part of the Municipal Borough of Eccles was added to the city, and in 1966, Salford was twinned with Clermont-Ferrand in France.

In 1974 the City and County Borough of Salford was abolished under the Local Government Act 1972, and was replaced by the metropolitan borough of City of Salford, a local government district of the new metropolitan county of Greater Manchester, with triple the territory of the former City of Salford, taking in neighbouring Eccles, Swinton and Pendlebury, and Worsley and Irlam. Both Salford and the wider City of Salford are unparished areas.

Parliamentary representation
Salford was enfranchised as a parliamentary borough by the Great Reform Act of 1832, returning a single Member of Parliament (MP). From 1868 it returned two MPs to the House of Commons until the Redistribution of Seats Act 1885, when the constituency was split into three single-member divisions: Salford North, Salford South and Salford West. Boundaries changed again under the provisions of the Representation of the People Act 1948 when the constituencies were reorganised into Salford East and Salford West. Since 1997, Salford has lain within the reconstituted Salford parliamentary constituency. Hazel Blears – a member of the Labour Party – has been the MP for the constituency since 1997. Rebecca Long-Bailey has been the MP for Salford and Eccles since 2015, a member of UK Labour. From the general election of 2010 Salford will be part of the new constituency of Salford and Eccles.
The wards of Broughton and Kersal, however, are to be part of the cross boundary constituency of Blackley and Broughton.

Geography

In 1904, Salford was recorded as "within a great loop of the River Irwell ... roughly three-quarters of a mile from north to south and one mile from east to west". Salford is contiguous with Manchester, and has been described "in participation of its trade, and for all other practical purposes, an integral part of it; presents a near resemblance to it in streets and edifices; contains several public buildings and a great public park, which belong fully more to Manchester than to itself". Greengate, the original centre of Salford, is located at a fording point on the river opposite Manchester Cathedral. In 1969 Nikolaus Pevsner wrote: 

The Irwell, sourced at Cliviger in Lancashire, flows from the north and for a distance forms the statutory boundary between Salford and Manchester. Flooding has historically been a problem and the Irwell has seen much modification along its course in Salford with some bends being removed, channelisation, and the construction of levees and bank reinforcements. Salford has expanded along the river valley to the north and south and on to higher ground on the valley sides at Irlams o' th' Height and Higher Broughton. Unconsolidated glacial deposits along the riverbank at Broughton have caused several landslides along the riverbank. The City Engineer's Department of the City of Salford recorded one such incident near Great Clowes Street in February 1882, and others in 1886, 1887 and 1888. In 1892 the road was propped with timber supports. The tram service along the road was discontinued in 1925, and the road closed to mechanically propelled vehicles in January 1926. Further slips saw the road closed completely in July 1933, and although no substantial movements have been recorded since 1948 slow subsidence around the Cliff continues to this day.

Salford's built environment is made up of a range of building stock. Some inner-city areas are noted for chronic urban decay. Salford's housing stock is characterised by an oversupply of older, smaller terraced housing and flatted accommodation that declined in value during the late 20th century. As demand fell, it left many owners in negative equity and often without the means to maintain their homes in reasonable condition. As a result, much of the built environment is poor.

Land use in Salford is overwhelmingly urban, with a number of green spaces. Others include Kersal Moor in Higher Kersal, The Meadow, Peel Park and the adjacent David Lewis Recreation Ground close to the University of Salford, and Albert Park and Clowes Park in Broughton. The territory of Salford is contiguous with other towns on all sides, and as defined by the Office for National Statistics forms the sixth-largest settlement in the Greater Manchester Urban Area, the United Kingdom's second-largest conurbation. The M602 motorway enters Salford from Eccles to the west. The A580 "East Lancashire Road" terminates at Salford, entering the area from Pendlebury.

Demography

As of the 2001 UK census, Salford had a population of 72,750. The 2001 population density was 9,151 per mi2 (3,533 per km2), with a 100 to 98.4 female-to-male ratio. Of those over 16 years age, 44.0% were single (never married) and 36.7% married. Salford's 32,576 households included 44.1% one-person, 22.0% married couples living together, 7.6% were co-habiting couples, and 13.3% single parents with their children. Of those aged 16–74, 37.3% had no academic qualifications, similar to that of 35.5% in all of the City of Salford but significantly higher than 28.9% in all of England. 15.9% of Salford's residents aged 16–74 had an educational qualification such as first degree, higher degree, qualified teacher status, qualified medical doctor, qualified dentist, qualified nurse, midwife, health visitor, etc. compared to 20% nationwide.

As a result of 19th-century industrialisation, Salford has had "a special place in the history of the British working class"; together with Manchester it had the world's "first fully formed industrial working class". Salford has not, in general, attracted the same minority ethnic and cosmopolitan communities as in other parts of Greater Manchester, although it did attract significant numbers of Irish in the mid-19th century. Many migrated to Salford because of the Great Hunger in Ireland combined with Salford's reputation as a hub for employment in its factories and docks. In 1848, Salford Roman Catholic Cathedral opened, reflecting the large Irish-born community in Salford at that time.

In the decades following the Second World War, Salford experienced significant population decline, as residents followed employment opportunities to other locations in Greater Manchester, taking advantage of a greater choice in the type and location of housing.

In 2011, Salford had a population of 103,886, which is about the same size as Rochdale. The population increased from 72,750 in the previous census, mainly due to boundary changes. 

In 2011, 22.7% of the population in the Salford USD (Urban Subdivision) were non-white British compared with 15.6% for the surrounding borough. The USD had a slightly larger percentage of Asian and black people. Salford has become a lot more ethnically diverse since the previous census 
mostly due to boundary changes but also due to the relocation of many BBC establishments from London between 2011 and 2012. This has created many jobs and encouraged migration to the area, which was previously very deprived since the loss of many traditional industries in the 20th century.

City Centre

Salford is mostly polycentric in that it has more than one single centre. Its main shopping centres are both Salford City Shopping Centre in the suburb of Pendleton and Salford Quays. 

The main city centre would be located around Bexley Square where the town hall and cathedral are located near to. However, as the city has expanded and incorporated the towns of Eccles, Walkden, Swinton and Pendlebury. There are now multiple retail and economic centres in these towns. It is quite similar to Stoke on Trent in that there are more than just one main shopping centre.

Salford is credited as the birthplace of the Bush Roller Chain. Hans Renold, a Swiss-born engineer, came to Salford in the late 19th century. In 1879 he purchased a small textile-chain making business in Ordsall from James Slater and founded the Hans Renold Company, what is now Renold, a firm which still produces chains. Renold invented the bush roller chain shortly after and began producing it. It is the type of chain most commonly used for transmission of mechanical power on bicycles, motorbikes, to industrial and agricultural machinery to uses as varied as rollercoasters and escalators.

According to the 2001 UK census, the industry of employment of Salford's residents aged 16–74 was 18.0% retail and wholesale, 14.4% property and business services, 12.3% manufacturing, 11.7% health and social work, 8.6% education, 7.3% transport and communications, 6.8% hotels and restaurants, 5.8% construction, 4.4% finance, 4.2% public administration, 0.6% energy and water supply, 0.3% agriculture, 0.1% mining, and 5.7% other. Compared with national figures, Salford had a relatively low percentage of residents working in agriculture. The census recorded the economic activity of residents aged 16–74, 4.4% students were with jobs, 9.1% students without jobs, 6.3% looking after home or family, 11.2% permanently sick or disabled, and 4.8% economically inactive for other reasons. The proportion of students economically active in Salford was higher than the City of Salford and England averages (3.0% and 2.6% respectively); the same is true for economically inactive students (5.1% in City of Salford and 4.7% in England). The rest of the figures were roughly inline with national trends.

Landmarks

Salford has a series of bridges over the Manchester Ship Canal and onto the River Irwell, including the Grade II listed Blackfriars Bridge, completed in 1820. The settlement is dominated by the several railway viaducts built in the 19th century. 

Another Grade II* listed building, Salford Cathedral, is a decorated neo-Gothic Roman Catholic church built between 1844 and 1848. Salford (Old) Town Hall, situated in Bexley Square off Chapel Street, is a Neo-classical brick building dressed in stone, designed by Richard Lane. Closer to Manchester, the tower of the Church of the Sacred Trinity dates from 1635, the main building from 1752. It was restored between 1871 and 1874. Public swimming baths were provided, on Blackfriars Road. Now in commercial use, the two-storey building was constructed in about 1890 from brick, with terracotta dressings and a part-glazed roof. 

The University of Salford campus, visible partly from the Crescent, contains a number of interesting buildings including the Royal Art Gallery and the Peel Building.

Kersal Cell is a Grade II* listed 16th-century timber-framed manor house, currently in use as a private residence. One of Salford's oldest buildings is the Grade I listed Ordsall Hall, a Tudor mansion and former stately home in nearby Ordsall. It dates back over 750 years, although the oldest surviving parts of the present hall were built in the 15th century. 

Salford Lads' Club is a recreational club established in 1903 and located in Ordsall. It is a listed building and gained international fame in 1986 when the pop band The Smiths posed in front of it for the inside cover of their album The Queen Is Dead. A report by English Heritage said "The building is thought to be the most complete example of this rare form of social provision to survive in England." In 2007, the Manchester Evening News reported that the club was third in a nationwide hunt to find the most iconic buildings in the country.

Transport

One of the earliest transport schemes in Salford was constructed by the Salford to Wigan Turnpike trust, by an Act of Parliament of 1753. Turnpike roads had a huge impact on the nature of business transport around the region. Packhorses were superseded by wagons, and merchants would no longer accompany their caravans to markets and fairs, instead sending agents with samples, and dispatching the goods at a later date. However, road transport was not without its problems, and in 1808 the Manchester Bolton & Bury Canal was connected to the River Irwell. In the main a coal-carrying canal, it provided a valuable boost to the economies of Salford and Manchester, with a large number of wharves at its terminus in Salford. Sixteen years later John Greenwood started the first bus operation from Pendleton to Market Street, Manchester.

The Liverpool & Manchester Railway – the world's first steam driven inter-city passenger railway – opened through Salford on 15 September 1830. The railway was primarily built to provide faster transport of materials and goods between the Port of Liverpool and mills in Manchester and surrounding towns, and stopped along the route at  Ordsall Lane railway station. Almost eight years later the Manchester and Bolton Railway was opened, terminating at Salford Central railway station.

By 1801 the population of both Manchester and Salford was about 94,000. By 1861 this had risen to about 460,000, and so in the same year John Greenwood Jr. made an application to Salford Borough Council and to the Pendleton Turnpike Trust, to build a tramway from Pendleton to Albert Bridge in Salford. The system was innovative in that the rails were designed to be 'flush' with the road surface, with a third central rail to accommodate a perambulator wheel attached to the front axle of the omnibus. Approval was granted and work commenced immediately, with the horse-pulled tramway finished in September 1861. It remained in use for a further eleven years when the condition of the track had deteriorated such that the council ordered it removed. The Tramways Act 1870 allowed councils to construct their own tramways, and on 17 May 1877 the 'Manchester and Salford Tramways' opened for business. The network of lines was largely complete by September 1880, the company changed its name to the Manchester Carriage & Tramways Company, and the system reached its peak in the 1890s. A steam tramway was opened on 12 April 1883 from Bury to Higher Broughton. The vehicles provoked letters of complaints from residents about the associated noise, dirt, and grease, and by 1888 the route was eventually curtailed to Besses o' th' Barn.

Electric trams were a common sight in early 20th century Salford, and had from 1901 replaced the earlier horse-drawn vehicles. A network of lines crossed the region, with coordinated services running through Salford, Manchester and the surrounding areas. Many served the new suburban housing and industrial developments built at the time, but in 1947 they were withdrawn in favour of more practical services – buses. The city is served by a complex road infrastructure, with connections from the M602 motorway to several major motorways, and A-roads including the A57 Regent Road and the A6042 Trinity Way. Salford City Council has also created both advisory and mandatory cycle lanes across the city.

Public transport in Salford is now co-ordinated by Transport for Greater Manchester (TfGM), a county-wide public body with direct operational responsibilities such as supporting (and in some cases running) local bus services, and managing integrated ticketing in Greater Manchester. Salford City Council is responsible for the administration and maintenance of public roads and footpaths throughout the city. The city is served by two railway stations, Salford Central and Salford Crescent. Most train services are provided by Northern Trains, although Salford Crescent is also served by TransPennine Express. Buses run to destinations throughout Salford, the City of Salford, across Greater Manchester and further afield: Pendleton is served by a route to Preston and Blackpool.

The Eccles line of the Manchester Metrolink runs through Salford, with stations at Exchange Quay, Salford Quays, Anchorage, Harbour City, Broadway, Langworthy, Weaste and more recently MediaCityUK. The line was opened in two stages, in 1999 and 2000, as Phase 2 of the system's development.

Since 2020, electric scooters have been available for public hire in central Salford, Salford Quays, Ordsall, Pendleton and at the University of Salford. The e-scooter hire service is operated by shared micromobility company Lime.

Education

University and museum

The University of Salford, a plate glass university, is one of four in Greater Manchester. It has its origins in the former Royal Technical College, which was granted the status of a College of Advanced Technology (CAT), on 2 November 1956. In November 1963 the Robbins Report recommended that the CATs should become technological universities; and on 4 April 1967 a Charter was established creating the University of Salford. The university is undergoing £150M of redevelopment through investment in new facilities, including a £10M law school and a £22M building for health and social care, which were opened in 2006.

The University of Salford has over 19,000 students, and was ranked 81st in the UK by The Times newspaper. In 2007, the university received nearly 17,000 applications for 3,660 places, and the drop-out rate from the university was 25%. Of the students graduating, 50% gained first class or 2:1 degrees, below the national average of about 55%. The level of student satisfaction in the 2009 survey ranged from 62% to 94%, depending on subject.

Salford developed several civic institutions; in 1806, Chapel Street became the first street in the world to be lit by gas (supplied by Phillips and Lee's cotton mill). Salford Museum and Art Gallery opened in November 1850, under the terms of the Museums Act 1845, as the Royal Museum and Public Library. It was built on the site of Lark Hill estate and Mansion, which was purchased by public subscription. The estate around the building was named Peel Park after Robert Peel who contributed to the subscription fund. The library was said to be the first unconditionally free public library in the country, preceding the Public Libraries Act 1850.

Schools and colleges
Despite the rapid progress made during the Industrial Revolution, by 1851 education in Salford was judged "inadequate to the wants of the population", and for those children who did get schooling "order and cleanliness were little regarded ... [they] were for the most part crowded in close and dirty rooms".

Salford has thirty-two primary schools, and five secondary schools. Until recently there were three main 6th form and FE colleges:  Pendleton College, Eccles College and Salford College. They merged to create Salford City College in January 2009.

Religion

From the formation of the Hundred of Salford, the entire area was within the Diocese of Lichfield. This diocese was divided in 1541, upon the creation of the See of Chester.

Early worship took place at the parish church of Manchester, however a small chantry chapel existed in 1368 on the only bridge linking the two settlements. In the 16th century, it was converted into a dungeon, and was later demolished in 1779. In 1634–35, Humphrey Booth, a wealthy local merchant, opened a chapel of ease, which a year later was consecrated as the Chapel of Sacred Trinity (the parish of Sacred Trinity was created in 1650). John Wesley preached in the building, before his break with the Anglican Church. However, upon his return in 1747, he preached in the open, at Salford Cross. The chapel was rebuilt in about 1752–53, although the tower probably belonged to the original building. It was restored in 1871–74 by the architect J. P. Holden and a chapel was added to the south-east in 1934. It is now a Grade II* listed building.

Salford Cathedral is one of the largest Catholic cathedrals in Northern England. It was built between 1844 and 1848, and was listed as a Grade II* building in 1980. It is at the centre of the Roman Catholic Diocese of Salford, which was founded in 1850 as one of the first post-Reformation Catholic dioceses in Britain. Its current boundaries encompass Manchester and a large part of North West England. The Bishop of Salford's official residence is at Wardley Hall.
 Salford Deanery is in the Salford Archdeaconry of the Church of England. The sixteen churches in the deanery include the Parish Church of Saint Paul the Apostle in Paddington, St. Thomas' in Pendleton, St Philip with St Stephen near the town hall and St Clement's in Ordsall.

The Greek Orthodox Church of the Annunciation, Manchester was founded in 1861, in Broughton. It was established by the local Greek immigrant community, who had arrived in the area soon after the Greek War of Independence in the early 19th century. It replaced an earlier place of worship on Cheetham Hill Road, and an earlier chapel on Wellington Street. It is the oldest purpose-built Orthodox church in the country.

Sports

Salford has a notable history in sports, which includes hosting some of the events in the 2002 Commonwealth Games: rugby league, speedway, and horse racing. Salford had a venue for horse racing since the 17th century; the earliest record of racing at Kersal Moor dates from 1687.

Salford Red Devils is the city's rugby league club and has been based in Salford since 1873. They participate in the Super League. Salford now play all home games at the AJ Bell Stadium. Junior rugby league is also played within Salford's boundaries, with Langworthy Reds, Folly Lane and Salford City Roosters amongst other clubs providing playing personnel to the senior club.

The Premiership side Sale Sharks play their home games at the AJ Bell Stadium since the start of the 2012–13 season

Salford Quays has been used as a major international triathlon site, but a 2009 aquathlon was cancelled because of a lack of competitors.

During the early part of the 20th century speedway was staged at Albion Stadium.

Prior to Salford City's promotion to the Football League in 2019, Salford was one of the largest settlements in the UK without a league football team;. In the formative years of the sport the region's football heartland was in east Manchester, with few teams to the west.  Salford City are Salford's only representatives in the Football League, playing in League Two, the fourth tier of English football, as of the 2019–20 season.

Culture

Harold Brighouse's play Hobson's Choice takes place in the Salford of 1880, and the 1954 film version was shot in the town. Walter Greenwood's 1933 novel Love on the Dole was set in a fictional area known as Hanky Park, said in the novel to be near Salford, but in reality based on Salford itself. A more modern fictional setting influenced by the area is Coronation Street'''s Weatherfield. The Salford of the 1970s was the setting for the BAFTA award winning East is East. Salford was featured in the second series of the Channel 4 programme The Secret Millionaire, screened in 2007. Salford is also home to the theatre venue Studio Salford.

The folk song "Dirty Old Town", written by native Ewan MacColl, is the origin of Salford's nickname. Local band Doves released a song on their 2005 album Some Cities called "Shadows of Salford". One of the most famous photographs of band The Smiths shows them standing outside the Salford Lads Club, and was featured in the artwork for their album The Queen Is Dead. The videos for the Timbaland song "The Way I Are", and the Justin Timberlake song "Lovestoned" were filmed in Salford.

Public services
Under the requirements of the Municipal Corporations Act, 1835, the County Borough of Salford was obliged to appoint a Watch Committee to establish a police force and appoint a chief constable. On 1 June 1968 the Manchester and Salford city constabularies formed the Manchester and Salford Police. Since 1974, Home Office policing in Salford has been provided by the Greater Manchester Police. The force's "(F) Division" has its headquarters for policing the City of Salford at Swinton, with further police stations in Little Hulton, Higher Broughton and Salford. The Statutory emergency fire and rescue service is provided by the Greater Manchester Fire and Rescue Service, whose headquarters are on Bolton Road in nearby Pendlebury.

Salford Royal Hospital dated back to 1830 and was extended in 1911. It was closed and converted into flats. The modern Salford Royal, at Hope, near the boundary with Eccles, was opened in 1882 as the Salford Union Infirmary. Later renamed Hope Hospital and then again as Salford Royal, it is a large NHS hospital administrated by Salford Royal NHS Foundation Trust. In a 2006–07 review of all 394 NHS Trusts in England by the Healthcare Commission, Salford Royal was one of 19 to be rated excellent in its quality of services and its use of resources. The North West Ambulance Service provides emergency patient transport. Other forms of health care are provided for locally by several small clinics and surgeries.

Waste management is co-ordinated by the local authority via the Greater Manchester Waste Disposal Authority. Salford's distribution network operator for electricity is United Utilities; there are no power stations in the city. United Utilities also manages Salford's drinking and waste water.

Notable people

People from Salford are called Salfordians, the city has been the birthplace to notable people of national and international acclaim. Joy Division were an English rock band formed in Salford in 1976. The group consisted of vocalist Ian Curtis, guitarist/keyboardist Bernard Sumner, bassist Peter Hook and drummer Stephen Morris which later reformed as New Order. Amongst other notable persons of historic significance with a connection to Salford are Emmeline Pankhurst, one of the founders of the British suffragette movement, who lived in Salford, and the scientist James Prescott Joule, who was born and raised in Salford. The novelist Walter Greenwood (Love on the Dole) and the dramatist Shelagh Delaney (A Taste of Honey'') were both born in, and wrote about, Salford.
Ewan MacColl, folk singer-songwriter, known as one of the instigators of the 1960s folk revival as well as for writing such songs as "The First Time Ever I Saw Your Face" and "Dirty Old Town", was born in Salford. Dirty old town was about Salford.
Salford is also the hometown of the band Happy Mondays and punk poet John Cooper Clarke.
Composer Sir Peter Maxwell Davies, who was appointed Master of the Queen's Music in 2004, was born in Salford. Notable Salfordian sportspeople include former England football international and Manchester United F.C. midfielder Paul Scholes, who with several celebrity team mates from his Manchester United playing days bought Salford F.C. 
Another notable resident of Salford is Eddie Colman, the youngest of the Manchester United players to die in the Munich air disaster of 6 February 1958, when only 21. Born at Archie Street in November 1936, he lived in the area all his life and is buried at Weaste Cemetery. His former home was demolished in the early 1970s. Geoff Bent, another Manchester United player who died at Munich, was born in Salford.
Other sporting Salfordians include Olympic Javelin Thrower Shelley Holroyd, English former snooker player Mick Price, who was born in the area, and Great Britain and England rugby league international and former Warrington Wolves front-rower Adrian Morley (later with the Salford Red Devils.) 
Actors Albert Finney and Robert Powell were both born and raised in Salford. 
Journalist Alistair Cooke who wrote and broadcast "Letter from America" for decades on the BBC was born in Salford.  Lesley Whittaker, nee Hill, environmental campaigner and one of the four founders of PEOPLE in 1972, the political party which later changed its name to the Green Party, was born in Salford. She was Head Prefect of Pendleton High School for Girls in 1961/2. The Party sparked an environmental  political movement around the world.

See also
Listed buildings in Salford, Greater Manchester

References

Bibliography

External links

www.salford.gov.uk, Salford City Council

 
Cities in North West England
Towns in Greater Manchester
Unparished areas in Greater Manchester
Geography of Salford